Francis Barber ( – 13 January 1801), born Quashey, was the Jamaican manservant of Samuel Johnson in London from 1752 until Johnson's death in 1784. Johnson made him his residual heir, with £70 a year to be given him by Trustees, expressing the wish that he move from London to Lichfield, Staffordshire, Johnson's native city. After Johnson's death, Barber did this, opening a draper's shop and marrying a local woman. Barber was also bequeathed Johnson's books and papers, and a gold watch. In later years he had acted as Johnson's assistant in revising his famous Dictionary of the English Language and other works. Barber was also an important source for Boswell concerning Johnson's life in the years before Boswell himself knew Johnson.

Biography
Barber was born a slave in Jamaica on a sugarcane plantation belonging to the Bathurst family.  His original name was Quashey, which is a common name for men of Coromantee origin.

At the age of about 10, he was brought to England by his owner, Colonel Richard Bathhurst, whose son, also called Richard, was a close friend of Johnson. Barber was sent to school in Yorkshire. Johnson's wife Elizabeth died in 1752, plunging Johnson into a depression that Barber later vividly described to James Boswell. The Bathursts sent Barber to Johnson as a valet, arriving two weeks after her death. Although the legal validity of slavery in England was ambiguous at this time (and the Somersett's Case of 1772 did not clarify it, only ruling that it was illegal to transport a slave out of England against his will), when the elder Bathurst died two years later he gave Barber his freedom in his will, with a small legacy of £12. Johnson himself was an outspoken opponent of slavery, not just in England but in the American colonies as well.

Royal Navy
Barber then went to work for an apothecary in Cheapside but kept in touch with Johnson. He later signed up as a sailor for the Navy. He served as a "landsman" aboard various ships, received regular pay and good reports, saw the coast of Britain from Leith to Torbay, and acquired a taste for tobacco. He was discharged "three days before George II died", in other words on 22 October 1760, and returned to London and to Johnson to be his servant. Barber's brief maritime career is known from James Boswell's Life of Johnson:

Later Johnson put Barber, by then in his early thirties, in a school, presumably so that he could act as Johnson's assistant. From Boswell's Life:

Later years
Barber is mentioned frequently in James Boswell's Life of Johnson and other contemporary sources, and there are at least two versions of a portrait, one now in Dr Johnson's House, which may be of him. Most recent art historians thought it was probably painted by James Northcote, or perhaps by Northcote's master Sir Joshua Reynolds, who was one of Barber's Trustees under the will. An alternative view, recently expressed on a BBC programme, is that it is by Reynolds himself, but of his own black servant, not Barber.

When making his will, Johnson asked Sir John Hawkins, later his first biographer, what provision he should make for Barber. Sir John said that a nobleman would give 50 pounds a year. Then I shall be "noblissimus" replied Johnson, and give him 70. Hawkins disapproved, and after Johnson's death criticised his "ostentatious bounty [and] favour to negroes". The bequest was indeed widely covered in the press. Johnson, in fact, left £750 in the trust of his friend Bennet Langton from which he was expected to pay an annuity.

Barber moved with his family to a rented terrace house in Lichfield, Johnson's birthplace, where – as a Gentleman's Magazine correspondent reported – he spent his time "in fishing, cultivating a few potatoes, and a little reading". Later he opened up a small village school in nearby Burntwood. The money from his inheritance did not last and Barber sold off his store of Johnson memorabilia to defray his debts. Johnson's biographers, Hawkins and Hester Piozzi, were critical of Barber's marriage to a white woman. He died in Stafford on 13 January 1801 due to an unsuccessful operation at Staffordshire Royal Infirmary. He was survived by his son, Samuel Barber, his daughter, Ann, and his wife, Elizabeth. Samuel became a Methodist lay preacher, while Elizabeth and Ann set up a small school. Both Samuel and Ann married white partners. Barber's descendants still farm near Lichfield.

Legacy 

Barber appears as a character in the 2015 play Mr Foote's Other Leg.

A plaque in Barber's honour on the railings of his and Johnson's former London home at 17 Gough Square (now Dr Johnson's House) was unveiled in 2016, by his great-great-great-great-grandson, Cedric Barber.

See also
Edward Thaddeus Barleycorn Barber
Black British
Historical immigration to Great Britain

References and sources
References

Sources
James Boswell: Life of Johnson 
Sir John Hawkins: Life of Johnson

External links
100 Great black britons
BBC feature
Transcript of Johnson's Will
Life, including portrait

1742 births
1801 deaths
18th-century Jamaican people
Black British former slaves
Black British writers
Jamaican slaves
Samuel Johnson